AVM Higher Secondary School is one of the oldest and largest school in Nepal. It was established in 1966 AD (2022 BS) at Manbhawan, Lalitpur, by a pioneer in the field of education, the late Satya Narayan Bahadur Shrestha. It won national and regional awards several times for its excellent results in national level examinations held by Higher Secondary Education Board of Nepal.After completing its 50 years, it celebrated its Golden Jubilee in the year 2073 BS (2016 AD).

History
The history of AVM High School is linked with the history of the late Satya Narayan Bahadur Shrestha, who is regarded by many as a selfless educationalist who spent his whole life in the field of education. With 120 students at a rented building known as Bhairab Bhavan (which was later acquired by the Himalaya Hotel at Kupondol, Lalitpur, Nepal), AVM High School has six modern buildings, three playgrounds, and two basketball courts. The school offers education from grade 1 to School Leaving Certificate level (equivalent to O levels offered by University of Cambridge).

AVM High School has also been conducting a 10+2 program since 2058 B.S., in the fields of Science and Management. 
AVM High School is semi-public school initiated by one of a guthi (community).

Student service and facilities

Science laboratories
The school has science laboratories with facilities for work in Physics, Chemistry and Biology. These encourage students to learn through experiments and researches. Students from science stream at the 10+2 level do laboratory work to reinforce their learning. Students of all classes visit the laboratories to get practical experience of the theories taught in class. Science exhibitions are held which enables students to explore their potential in science and technology

Computer lab 
The school owns a computer lab hall with over 100 computers. Students take classes on computer programming, webpage development and Microsoft applications such as Word, Excel, and Power Point.

Classrooms 
The classrooms accommodate 40 to 50 students.

Area and environments 
The bus stops near the school are Manbhawan and Lagankhel, at five minutes walking distance. AVM has eight Ropanis of land in a peaceful environment and greenery, with a garden, lawn, basketball court, and academic buildings.

Residential hostel and dormitories 
The school has accommodation for its students in a hostel, close to the school building. This offers students residing outside the KTM valley with an opportunity to study peacefully and comfortably. The hostel is under regular supervision of the principal and is looked after by hostel wardens and matrons. 

Study classes and tutorials are held in the mornings and evenings. The time table ensures that all students get ample opportunity to take part in co- and extra-curricular activities.

Cafeteria 
The cafeteria provides food to its students.  Hot and cold drinks are available with snacks. The old cafeteria was in a messy condition so the school management has built a new one.

Transportation 
The school offers transportation facilities to its students at the parent's request. The information sheet of route, time of arrival/departure, bus number, and bus fare is available in the school. Students show their identity cards to board the bus.

Extracurricular activities

Sports 
AVM is involved in cricket competitions and table tennis competitions. AVM also organizes a cricket tournament every year in the memory of the founder late SNB Shrestha.

Educational trips 
Field trips are arranged, these include excursions the Botanical Garden, zoo, historical places, science experiments, and orphanage. An annual picnic is held during winter season.

Clubs 
AVM clubs include Maths Club, Science Club, Eco Club and Writers Club.

Internal evaluation 
Internal evaluation of a student is done via monthly tests, terminal examinations, project works and involvement in club activities. Monthly progress reports on homework, note presentation and classroom performance are sent to parents. A parent teacher meeting is held to talk about each student's performance. AVM has three terminal examinations in a session before the board exam (including pre-board).

External links
 https://web.archive.org/web/20160304024748/http://hamroeducation.com/index.php?obj=foregin-universities-detail&id=44
 Adarsha Vidya Mandir official Facebook page

Schools in Nepal
1996 establishments in Nepal